Aftertones of Infinity is a symphonic poem written by the American composer Joseph Schwantner.  The work was commissioned by the American Composers Orchestra and completed in 1978.  It was first performed by the American Composers Orchestra conducted by Lukas Foss in Alice Tully Hall, New York City, on January 29, 1979.  The piece was later awarded the 1979 Pulitzer Prize for Music.

Reception
Reviewing a 1991 revival of the piece, the music critic Allan Kozinn of The New York Times wrote:

References

Compositions by Joseph Schwantner
1978 compositions
Symphonic poems
Music commissioned by the American Composers Orchestra
Pulitzer Prize for Music-winning works